Johann Gottlieb Friedrich von Bohnenberger (5 June 1765 – 19 April 1831) was a German astronomer born at Simmozheim, Württemberg.  He studied at the University of Tübingen.   In 1798, he was appointed  professor of mathematics and astronomy at the University.

He published:  
 Anleitung zur geographischen Ortsbestimmung (Guide to geographic locations), 1795
 Astronomie (Astronomy), 1811
 Anfangsgründe der höhern Analysis (Initial reasons of higher analysis), 1812.

In 1817, he systematically explained the design and use of a gyroscope apparatus which he called simply a “Machine.” Several examples of the 'Machine' were constructed by Johann Wilhelm Gottlob Buzengeiger of Tübingen.  Johann 
Friedrich Benzenberg had already mentioned Bohnenberger's invention (describing it at length) in several letters beginning in 1810. 

Bohnenberger died at Tübingen. 

The lunar crater Bohnenberger is named after him.

See also
Bohnenberger electrometer
Kater's pendulum

References

External links
Bohnenberger's apparatus (gyroscope)

18th-century German mathematicians
19th-century German mathematicians
18th-century German astronomers
19th-century German inventors
1765 births
1831 deaths
19th-century German astronomers
Members of the Göttingen Academy of Sciences and Humanities